Abby Fung (born 30 October 1982) is a Taiwanese actress and model.

Filmography
Romantic Princess (2007, TV series)
 (2008–2009, TV series)
K.O.3an Guo (2009–2010, TV series)
Knock Knock Loving You (2009, TV series)
Zombie Fight Club (2014 as Nana)My Sassy Girl 2 (2010)'' (2012, TV series)

References

External links

1982 births
Living people
Taiwanese film actresses
Taiwanese television actresses
21st-century Taiwanese actresses